Prunus laxinervis is a species of plant in the family Rosaceae. It is found in Indonesia and Malaysia.

References

Sources

laxinervis
Vulnerable plants
Taxonomy articles created by Polbot